

Notable people
This list contains people associated with Lake Forest College in Lake Forest, Illinois, including current and former college presidents, as well as notable alumni and faculty members.

Alumni

Academia
 Sig Gissler, class of 1956, professor of journalism at Columbia University
 Philip Klinkner, class of 1985, James S. Sherman professor of government at Hamilton College
 William Mather Lewis, class of 1900, former president of George Washington University and Lafayette College
 Ralph J. Mills Jr., class of 1954, professor of English at the University of Illinois at Chicago
 Edward Wingenbach, class of 1991, president of Hampshire College, former acting president and dean of faculty at Ripon College

Arts and entertainment
Richard Armstrong, class of 1971, director of the Solomon R. Guggenheim Museum and Foundation
Blair Butler, stand-up comedian and television host
Allan Carr, class of 1958, producer of the film Grease and Broadway's La Cage aux Folles, Tony Award winner
Kahil El'Zabar, class of 1977, musician and composer
Scott Goldstein, Emmy Award-winning producer, writer, and director (L.A. Law, Doogie Howser, M.D., Today Show)
Steve Goodman, class of 1970, Grammy Award-winning folk singer, writer of "Go, Cubs, Go"
Kelly Leonard, class of 1988, producer at Second City
Colin McComb, class of 1991, writer and game designer
Natalia Nogulich, class of 1971, actress, writer, professor, and director
Ian Punnett, class of 1982, broadcaster, author, and Episcopal deacon
Penelope Rosemont, surrealist movement visual artist, writer, and publisher
Richard Widmark, class of 1936, popular post-WWII era actor, "the face of film noir"

Athletics
Herb Alward, football player and football coach
John Biolo, class of 1938, NFL player and football coach
Mush Crawford, professional football, basketball, and baseball player, football coach
Ernie Krueger, class of 1915, professional baseball player
E. J. Mather, class of 1910, football and basketball player, football coach
Diana Nyad, class of 1973, world-record distance swimmer, national squash player, author, journalist, and motivational speaker
John H. Rice, class of 1895, football and baseball player, football coach, and athletic director
Andy Russo, class of 1970, basketball player and coach
Casey Urlacher, class of 2003, professional football player and mayor of Mettawa, Illinois
Robbie Ventura, class of 1992, professional racing cyclist, hockey player
Joe Zemaitis, class of 2002, professional triathlete

Business
Dave Beran, class of 2003, James Beard award-winning chef, owner of Dialogue in Santa Monica, California
Nate Berkus, class of 1994, award-winning interior designer and decorator, New York Times bestselling author, movie producer, and host of The Nate Berkus Show
Chester R. Davis, businessman, assistant secretary to the U.S. Army, Vice-President of the Association of the U.S. Army
James C. Foster, class of 1972, chairman, CEO, and President of Charles River Laboratories, Inc., 2003 Forbes Entrepreneur of the Year
Grace Groner, class of 1931, philanthropist and secretary at Abbott Laboratories
Rob Mermin, class of 1971, author, founder of award-winning international touring company Circus Smirkus
Nicholas J. Pritzker, Chairman of the Board and CEO of the Hyatt Development Corporation, co-founder and co-chair of Clean Energy Trust

Engineering and science
Richard J. Ablin, class of 1961, notable for his work on tests for prostate cancer screening
Walter A. Hill, agricultural scientist, notable for his work on sweet potato crops
William Mather Lewis, class of 1900, American teacher, university president, local politician, and state and national government official
William Duncan MacMillan, attended Lake Forest College in 1889, made notable contributions in astronomy and mathematics
Aaron Swartz, computer programmer, entrepreneur, writer, political organizer, and Internet hacktivist

Government and politics
Marsha E. Barnes, class of 1969, U.S. Ambassador to Suriname and U.S. State Department official
Victor deGrazia, political strategist, former campaign manager and deputy to Illinois governor Dan Walker, successful jury consultant
Homer Galpin, Illinois State Senator and lawyer
Susan Garrett, class of 1994, former Illinois State Senator for the 29th District and 59th district in the House of Representatives
George E.Q. Johnson, class of 1900, United States Attorney who successfully prosecuted Al Capone for tax evasion, Judge of the United States District Court for the Northern District of Illinois
Otto Kerner Sr., class of 1905, Judge of the United States Court of Appeals for the Seventh Circuit, Attorney General of Illinois
Rick Kolowski, class of 1966, Nebraska State Senator and educator
Peg Lautenschlager, class of 1977, attorney, former Attorney General of Wisconsin, first woman elected to be Attorney General in Wisconsin
Frank Richman, class of 1904, Justice of the Indiana Supreme Court, judge at the Nuremberg trials
Adolph J. Sabath, class of 1891, attorney, member of the U.S. House of Representatives
Edward J. Smejkal, class of 1895, Illinois State Representative and lawyer
Trent Van Haaften, class of 1987, Indiana State Representative, 2010 Democratic nominee for Congress in Indiana's 8th district

Religion
John Wilbur Chapman, class of 1879, Presbyterian evangelist
Lloyd John Ogilvie, class of 1952, Presbyterian minister, former United States Senate Chaplain

Writers, journalists and publishers
Herbert Block, political cartoonist and three-time Pulitzer Prize winner
Jacqueline Carey, class of 1986, New York Times bestselling fantasy fiction author
Andrea Day, class of 1987, reporter at WNYW-FOX 5 New York City until 2011, winner of three Emmy Awards
John Thomson Faris, author, editor, and clergyman
Sig Gissler, class of 1956, professor, administrator of the Pulitzer Prize from 2002-2014, former editor of the Milwaukee Journal Sentinel
Ed Janus, class of 1968, independent audio producer, interviewer, and journalist
Ralph J. Mills, class of 1954, acclaimed American poet, scholar, and professor
Bob Verdi, class of 1967, Chicago Blackhawks historian, Elmer Ferguson Memorial Award winner

Coaches
John W. Breen
Ira T. Carrithers
Sylvester Derby
Ralph Glaze
Clarence Herschberger 
Ed Hughes
Ralph Jones
Wally Lemm
Ralph Thacker

Faculty

Warder Clyde Allee
Robert Archambeau
Alan Axelrod
James Mark Baldwin
Joseph Carens
Elizabeth Teter Lunn
Rebecca Makkai, writer and author of The Great Believers, which was shortlisted for the National Book Award
Elizabeth Marquardt
Janet McCracken
Charles A. Miller
Ronald Miller
Ahmad Sadri
Fernando Sanford
Davis Schneiderman
Lawrence M. Schoen
Stephen D. Schutt
Robert Pelton Sibley
David Spadafora
Holly Swyers, author of Wrigley Regulars: Finding Community in the Bleachers.
Gerald Vizenor, Native American writer, activist, academic, and literary critic

Presidents

Daniel Gregory, 1878–1886
William C. Roberts, 1886–1892
John M. Coulter, 1893–1896
James Gore King McClure, 1897–1901
Richard D. Harlan, 1901–1906
John S. Nollen, 1907–1917
Herbert M. Moore, 1920–1942
Ernest A. Johnson, 1942–1959
William Graham Cole, 1960–1970
Eugene Hotchkiss III, 1970–1993
David Spadafora, 1993–2001
Stephen D. Schutt, 2001–2022
Dr. Jill M. Baren, 2022–present

Fictional
Bree Van de Kamp and her husband Rex in Desperate Housewives both attended Lake Forest College

References

Lake Forest College